Mary Hardy may refer to:

Mary Hardy (actuary), professor of actuarial science
Mary Hardy (diarist) (1733–1809), English brewer's wife and diarist
Mary Anne Hardy (c.1825–1891), English novelist and travel writer
María Cordero Hardy (born 1932), Puerto Rican scientist whose research has helped in the understanding of the properties of vitamin E
Mary Hardy (comedian) (1931–1985), Australian comedian

See also
Mary Hardy Reeser (1884–1951), suspected victim of spontaneous human combustion
Marieke Hardy (born 1976), Australian writer, broadcaster, television producer and actress